V1, V01 or V-1 can refer to version one (for anything) (e.g., see version control)

V1, V01 or V-1 may also refer to:

In aircraft
 V-1 flying bomb, a World War II German weapon
 V1 speed, the maximum speed at which an aircraft pilot may abort a takeoff without causing a runway overrun
 Vultee V-1, an American single-engine airliner of the 1930s
 Fokker V.1, a German parasol monoplane experimental fighter prototype, built in 1916
 The first prototype/experimental (Versuchs) airframe of nearly any German WW II-era military aircraft

Vessels
 V1-class destroyer, a German World War I destroyer class
 USS V-1, 1924–1931 designation of the USS Barracuda (SS-163), first of the US "V-boat" series of submarines
 V1, a rudderless single-paddler outrigger canoe

In medicine
 V1, the primary visual cortex
 V1, the ophthalmic nerve, first division of the trigeminal nerve
 V1, one of six precordial leads in electrocardiography

In astronomy
 V1, or Hubble variable number one is the name given to a historically important Cepheid variable star in the Andromeda Galaxy

Other uses
 Base form (V1) of an English verb
 ATC code V01 Allergens, a subgroup of the Anatomical Therapeutic Chemical Classification System
 V1 (classification), a Paralympic archery classification for people with visual disabilities
 LNER Class V1, a 1930–1939 British 2-6-2 tank engine class
 NER Class V1, a class of British steam locomotives officially classified V/09, but classified V1 in some sources
 Nikon 1 V1, a camera
 V1 Gallery, in Copenhagenany
 V.1, a telephone communications standard of the ITU-T
 V1, a visual query language for property graphs
 Z1 (computer), previously known as V1
V1 (film), a 2019 Indian film

See also
 VI (disambiguation) (letter "i" as opposed to number "1")